Hollywood and Vine, the intersection of Hollywood Boulevard and Vine Street in Hollywood, a district of Los Angeles, became known in the 1920s for its concentration of radio and movie-related businesses. The Hollywood Walk of Fame is centered on the intersection.

Few production facilities are still located in the immediate area.  One of the few remaining is the Capitol Records Tower to the north of the intersection.

The namesake subway station for the Metro B Line is located directly below the intersection, but the entrance/exit to the station is located one block east at Hollywood and Argyle Avenue. The intersection is located in ZIP code 90028.

History

The area was a lemon grove until 1903, when Daeida Beveridge allowed one corner of the dirt intersection on her property to be used for the building of the Hollywood Memorial Church for the local German Methodist population.

The streets were renamed in 1910, when the city of Hollywood was merged with Los Angeles.

Beginning in the 1920s, during the Golden Age of Hollywood, the area began to see an influx of money and influence as movie and music businesses moved to the district, turning the local farms and orchards into movie backlots. Hollywood and Vine was the second busiest intersection in the area, after Wilshire Boulevard and Western Avenue.

In the 1930s, radio station KFWB spoke of "broadcasting live from Hollywood and Vine," and newspaper columnists Hedda Hopper and Jimmie Fidler regularly touted the intersection's mystique.

In 1958, the intersection became the central point of the newly installed Hollywood Walk of Fame. Later Neil Armstrong, Buzz Aldrin and Michael Collins, the astronauts of the first lunar landing mission Apollo 11, were awarded television stars for coverage of the mission, and given the places of honor at the corner of Hollywood and Vine.

By the 1960s, however, many studios and broadcasters had moved onto more upscale areas, and the area fell into disrepair and disrepute, with many abandoned stores and offices, and the streets themselves, claimed by squatters and panhandlers. It took several decades for redevelopment to take hold, and visitors looking for Hollywood dreams were often taken aback by the area's contrast with shinier tourist meccas.

The Hollywood/Vine subway station opened in 1999, and led to more sustained and serious redevelopment in the area. On May 29, 2003, Hollywood and Vine was named "Bob Hope Square" to commemorate Hope's 100th birthday.

In urban folklore, many of the local buildings are considered to be part of "Haunted Hollywood", home to the ghosts of celebrities (and less stellar residents) of Hollywood's legendary past. The intersection has been mentioned or alluded to in dozens of songs, films, video games, music videos and other popular media, often as a symbol of Hollywood's lure as a destination for dreamers, or for its decadence and disappointments.

Historic buildings

The first "high-rise" building at Hollywood and Vine was the 12-story Taft Building, built in 1923 on the southeast corner on the site of the old Memorial Church. It was built for A.Z. Taft Jr. by architects Walker & Eisen, in the Renaissance Revival style. "In Hollywood's golden age, all the studios had offices there," said Hollywood Chamber of Commerce President Leron Gubler, including Charlie Chaplin and Will Rogers. From 1935 to 1945, it was home to the Academy of Motion Picture Arts and Sciences offices.

On the northwest corner, the Laemmle Building was built in the International Style in 1932 by architect Richard Neutra for Carl Laemmle, head of Universal Pictures. Unfortunately, the original drawing depicting the design that Neutra intended was not built because of the 1929 stock market crash. It was significantly altered from 1940, and retained few of its original features. The building was gutted by fire in April 2008, and razed in October 2008. To the west of the Laemmle Building is another landmark International Style building, by Neutra's friend and rival Rudolf Schindler. The building was originally known for Sardi's Diner, and is now home to the Cave Theater.

To the north of the Laemmle Building is a Spanish Colonial style building housing the Avalon Hollywood, opened on January 24, 1927, as the Hollywood Playhouse and designed by the architectural firm of H. L. Gogerty and Carl Jules Weyl. The building's name has changed many times over the 20th century, but was known as the Hollywood Palace for many years before its most recent renaming.

On the northeast corner of Hollywood and Vine is the Equitable Building, a Gothic Deco commercial tower built in 1929 on the northeast corner, designed by Aleck Curlett. Next to it is the Art Deco movie house, the Pantages Theatre, built in 1930 by B. Marcus Priteca—the first of its kind in the United States. The Academy Award ceremonies were held at the Pantages from 1949 to 1959.

On the southwest corner, the B.H. Dyas building was built in 1927 by architect Frederick Rice Dorn. The B.H Dyas Specialty Emporium was a victim of the depression. From 1931 to 1982 it housed The Broadway-Hollywood department store. The sign is a historical landmark and remains. In 2007, the Broadway Hollywood Building underwent extensive reconstruction and has opened as a luxury class apartment building. The building has an art deco style annex just to the west of it built in the 1930s. (1943). In 1927, while researching The Skyscraper for DeMille Studios, Ayn Rand visited the building and, while waiting for her contact to arrive, went to the nearby Hollywood Branch Library, where she was reunited with Frank O'Connor, whom she had lost track of 6 months earlier when DeMille's The King of Kings finished shooting; Rand and O'Connor then began dating, were married in 1929 until his death in 1979.

Just to the south on Vine was the fabled Hollywood Plaza Hotel, built in 1924 and home to silent film star Clara Bow's "It Cafe". Across the street, the Hollywood Brown Derby restaurant, the second in the chain, opened in 1929 in a Spanish Colonial Revival building designed for Cecil B. DeMille; it was demolished in 1994, leaving only a part of the Derby facade, which itself was threatened with demolition as of April 2006. Farther south on Vine were the original Lasky-Paramount Studios, later NBC's West coast studios; and ABC's first West coast studios.

Redevelopment and urbanization 

A number of high-profile projects are attempting to restore the lost luster of the area. , major renovations announced by the Los Angeles city council, began construction on the intersection, developments expected to cost upwards of $600-million. The new projects call for a 305-room W Hotel tower with 143 adjoining condominiums. Also part of the plan for the southeast corner of the intersection, 375 luxury apartments, restaurants, a nightclub, stores and a spa, as well as retail renovations of the Pantages Theater, similar to the Hollywood and Highland Center a mile down the Boulevard. Expected completion date is November 2009.

Two other large projects are Palisades Development Group's $50-million conversion of the former Equitable office building to condominiums and Kor Group's $70-million conversion of the former Broadway department store, also into condos.

Basque Nightclub fire
On April 30, 2008, a large fire destroyed the Basque Nightclub at Hollywood and Vine. It required the calling of 23 fire engines. This destroyed the historic Laemmle building.

References
 Kid Rock’s song Cowboy refers to this intersection.

External links

 Hollywood Entertainment District
 Hollywood Boulevard - myth & reality
 Historic Resources Group - Historic LA Project

Geography of Los Angeles
Neighborhoods in Hollywood, Los Angeles
Hollywood Boulevard
Buildings and structures in Hollywood, Los Angeles